Eugenius II was the Ecumenical Patriarch of Constantinople from 1821 to 1822.  Prior to his election as Patriarch, he was Archbishop of Anchialos in Bulgaria.

Eugenius was among the Archbishops held as hostages by Mahmud II along with Patriarch Gregory V when the Greek War of Independence broke out in 1821. On 10 April 1821, Gregory V was deposed and hanged by the Turks in the central gate of the Ecumenical Patriarchate. Archbishop Eugenius, still a prisoner at the time, was elected as the new Patriarch under the name Eugenius II.

Eastern Orthodox Christians from Bulgaria
19th-century Ecumenical Patriarchs of Constantinople
1780 births
1822 deaths